Andrey Viktorovich Ashchev  (born 10 May 1983) is a Russian male volleyball player. He was part of the Russia men's national volleyball team at the 2014 FIVB Volleyball Men's World Championship in Poland. He played for Zenit Kazan. Andrey with national team winner of  World league 2013 and Championship Europe 2013.

Sporting achievements

Clubs

CEV Champions League
  2015/2016 – with Zenit Kazan
  2016/2017 – with Zenit Kazan

National team
 2017  CEV European Championship

National championships
 2015/2016  Russian Championship, with Zenit Kazan

References

1983 births
Living people
Russian men's volleyball players
Olympic volleyball players of Russia
Volleyball players at the 2016 Summer Olympics
Sportspeople from Stavropol Krai
VC Zenit Saint Petersburg players
Ural Ufa volleyball players